The 1915 Svenska Mästerskapet was the 20th season of Svenska Mästerskapet, the football cup to determine the Swedish champions. Djurgårdens IF won the tournament by defeating Örgryte IS in the final with a 4–1 score.

Qualifying rounds

First qualifying round

|}

Second qualifying round

|}

Main tournament

Preliminary round

|-
|colspan=3 align=center|Replays

|}

Quarter-finals

|-
|colspan=3 align=center|Replays

|}

Semi-finals

|}

Final

References 

Print

http://eu-football.info/_tournament.php?id=3674

1915
Svenska
Mas
1915–16 in Swedish football